The American Journal of Industrial Medicine is a monthly peer-reviewed medical journal covering occupational safety and health, as well as environmental health. It was established in 1980 and is published by Wiley-Blackwell. The editor-in-chief is John Meyer, formerly Steven B. Markowitz (Queens College, City University of New York). According to the Journal Citation Reports, the journal has a 2014 impact factor of 1.737.

References

External links

Occupational safety and health journals
Environmental health journals
Monthly journals
Wiley-Blackwell academic journals
Publications established in 1980
English-language journals